Euparia is a genus of aphodiine dung beetles in the family Scarabaeidae. There are about six described species in Euparia.

Species
These six species belong to the genus Euparia:
 Euparia africana Schmidt, 1909
 Euparia ambrymensis Paulian, 1941
 Euparia baraudi Chalumeau & Gruner, 1974
 Euparia castanea LePeletier & Serville, 1828
 Euparia consimilis Balthasar, 1945
 Euparia mirabilis (Balthasar, 1945)

References

Further reading

 
 
 

Scarabaeidae genera
Articles created by Qbugbot